This is a list of 196 species in Macrocera, a genus of predatory fungus gnats in the family Keroplatidae.

M. abdominalis Okada, 1937 c g
M. aegaea Matile, 1969 g
M. africana Freeman, 1970 c g
M. alacra Coher, 1988 c g
M. albipunctata Matile, 1973 c g
M. alpicola Winnertz, 1863 c g
M. alpicoloides Okada, 1937 c g
M. altaica Ostroverkhova, 1979 c g
M. alternata Brunetti, 1912 c g
M. americana Lepeletier, 1841 g
M. anglica Edwards, 1925 c g
M. angulata Meigen, 1818 c g
M. annulata Tonnoir, 1927 c g
M. annuliventris Matile, 1972 c g
M. antennalis Marshall, 1896 c g
M. antennata Freeman, 1951 c g
M. apicalis Hoffmeister, 1844 c g
M. aquabellissima Chandler, 1994 c g
M. aquilonia Stackelberg, 1945 c g
M. arcuata Sasakawa, 1966 c g
M. armata Freeman, 1951 c g
M. aterrima Stackelberg, 1945 c g
M. azorica Stora, 1945 g
M. basilewskyi Vanschuytbroeck, 1965 c g
M. beringensis Malloch, 1923 i g
M. bicolor Garrett, 1925 i c g
M. bilucida Matile, 1979 c g
M. bipunctata Edwards, 1925 c g
M. breviceps Sasakawa, 1966 c g
M. brunnea Brunetti, 1912 c g
M. buskettina Chandler & Gatt, 2000 c g
M. campbelli Edwards, 1927 c g
M. caudata Matile, 1977 c g
M. centralis Meigen, 1818 c g
M. chilena Lane, 1962 c g
M. clara Loew, 1869 i c g
M. clavinervis Van Duzee, 1928 i c g
M. comosa Ostroverkhova, 1979 c g
M. concinna Williston, 1896 c g
M. coxata Sasakawa, 1966 c g
M. crassicornis Winnertz, 1863 c g
M. critica Chandler, 2006 c g
M. crozetensis Colless, 1970 c g
M. cypriaca Chandler, 2006 c g
M. decorosa Skuse, 1888 c g
M. delicata Skuse, 1888 c g
M. diluta Adams, 1903 i c g
M. distincta Garrett, 1925 i c g
M. districta Coher, 1988 c g
M. diversimaculata Santos Abreu, 1920 c g
M. edwardsi Freeman, 1970 c g
M. egregia Meijere, 1924 c g
M. elegans Brunetti, 1912 c g
M. elegantula Coher, 1988 c g
M. elgonensis Freeman, 1970 c g
M. ephemeraeformis Alexander, 1924 c g
M. estonica Landrock, 1924 c g
M. exilis Matile, 1972 c g
M. ezoensis Okada, 1937 c g
M. fasciata Meigen, 1804 c g
M. fascipennis Staeger, 1840 c g
M. fastuosa Loew, 1869 c g
M. femina Coher, 1963 c g
M. fisherae Shaw, 1935 i c g
M. flavescens Freeman, 1951 c g
M. flavicosta Brunetti, 1912 c g
M. flavithorax Freeman, 1951 c g
M. flavobrunnea Freeman, 1951 c g
M. flexa Ostroverkhova, 1974 c g
M. floridana Johnson, 1926 i c g
M. formosa Loew, 1866 i c g
M. frigida Sack, 1923 c g
M. fryeri Edwards, 1913 c g
M. fumidapex Freeman, 1954 c g
M. fumigata Tollet, 1955 c g
M. funerea Freeman, 1951 c g
M. fusciventris Roser, 1840 c g
M. fuscoides Evenhuis, 2006 c g
M. garretti Evenhuis, 2006 c g
M. gemagea Bechev, 1991 c g
M. geminata Johannsen, 1910 i c g
M. glabrata Tonnoir, 1927 c g
M. gourlayi Tonnoir, 1927 c g
M. grandis Lundstroem, 1912 c g
M. griveaudi Matile, 1972 c g
M. guaianasi Lane, 1950 c g
M. guarani Lane, 1950 c g
M. hermonophila Chandler, 1994 c g
M. hirsuta Loew, 1869 i c g
M. hirtipennis Van Duzee, 1928 i c g
M. horrida Freeman, 1951 c g
M. howletti Marshall, 1896 c g
M. hudsoni Tonnoir, 1927 c g
M. hyalinimculata Santos Abreu, 1920 c g
M. hyalipennis Shaw, 1941 i c g
M. immaculata Johnson, 1902 i c g
M. inaequalis Freeman, 1951 c g
M. incompleta Becker, 1908 c g
M. inconcinna Loew, 1869 c g
M. inconspicua Brunetti, 1912 c g
M. indigena Johannsen, 1910 c g
M. insignis Vockeroth, 1976 c g
M. interrogationis (Speiser, 1913) c g
M. inversa Loew, 1869 c g
M. jonica Martinovsky, 2001 c g
M. kerteszi Lundstroem, 1911 c g
M. klossi Edwards, 1933 c g
M. kraussi Matile, 1988 c g
M. lacustrina Coher, 1988 c g
M. lateralis Freeman, 1970 c g
M. levantina Chandler, 1994 c g
M. longibrachiata Landrock, 1917 c g
M. lutea Meigen, 1804 c g
M. luteobrunnea Matile, 1977 c g
M. maculata Meigen, 1818 c g
M. maculosa Matsumura, 1915 c g
M. mastersi Skuse, 1888 c g
M. matilei Papavero, 1978 c g
M. microsticta Edwards, 1932 c g
M. minima Matile, 1988 c g
M. nana Macquart, 1826 g
M. nebulosa Coquillett, 1901 i c g
M. neobrunnea Wu & Yang, 1993 c g
M. nepalensis Coher, 1963 c g
M. nephrotoma Matile, 1972 c g
M. ngaireae Edwards, 1927 c g
M. nigricoxa Winnertz, 1863 c g
M. nigropicea Lundstroem, 1906 c g
M. nitens Edwards, 1928 c g
M. nitida Freeman, 1970 c g
M. nobilis Johnson, 1922 i c g
M. obscura Winnertz, 1863 c g
M. obsoleta Edwards, 1927 c g
M. ornata Brunetti, 1912 c g
M. parcehirsuta Becker, 1907 c g
M. parva Lundstroem, 1914 c g
M. penicillata Costa, 1857 c g
M. pensylvanica Lepeletier, 1841 g
M. perpictula Edwards, 1940 c g
M. phalerata Meigen, 1818 c g
M. philadelphica Lepeletier, 1841 g
M. picta Freeman, 1951 c g
M. pictipennis Matile, 1969 c g
M. picturata Edwards, 1933 c g
M. pilosa Garrett, 1925 i c g
M. plaumanni Edwards, 1940 c g
M. propleuralis Edwards, 1941 c g
M. pulchra Tonnoir, 1927 c g
M. pumilio Loew, 1869 c g
M. puncticosta Edwards, 1934 c g
M. pusilla Meigen, 1830 g
M. quinquemaculata Sasakawa, 1966 c g
M. renalifera Matile, 1988 c g
M. ruficollis Edwards, 1927 c g
M. scoparia Marshall, 1896 c g
M. simbhanjangana Coher, 1963 c g
M. similis Garrett, 1925 i c g
M. sinaitica Chandler, 1994 c g
M. smithi (Shaw, 1948) i c g
M. stigma Curtis, 1837 c g
M. stigmatoides Curtis, 1837 g
M. stigmoides Edwards, 1925 c g
M. straatmani Matile, 1988 c g
M. striatipennis Strobl, 1906 c g
M. sudetica Landrock, 1924 c g
M. summatis Vockeroth, 1976 c g
M. suppositia Tollet, 1955 c g
M. tawnia Wu, 1995 c g
M. testacea Philippi, 1865 c g
M. thomsoni Lynch Arribalzaga, 1882 c g
M. thoracica Matile, 1977 c g
M. tonnoiri Matile, 1989 c g
M. trinubila Edwards, 1933 c g
M. trispina Coher, 1963 c g
M. trivittata Johnson, 1922 i c g
M. tusca Loew, 1869 c g
M. tyrrhenica Edwards, 1928 c g
M. uncinata Ostroverkhova, 1979 c g
M. unica Fisher, 1939 c g
M. unicincata Matile, 1988 c g
M. unicincta Matile, 1988 g
M. unidens Edwards, 1931 c g
M. unipunctata Tonnoir, 1927 c g
M. uniqua Garrett, 1925 i c g
M. unispina Freeman, 1970 c g
M. valdiviana Philippi, 1865 c g
M. variegata Ostroverkhova, 1979 c g
M. variola Garrett, 1925 c g
M. vespertina Matile, 1973 c g
M. villosa Garrett, 1925 i c g
M. vishnui Coher, 1963 c g
M. vittata Meigen, 1830 c g
M. vulcania Matile, 1979 c g
M. wanawarica Ostroverkhova & Zaitzeva, 1979 c g
M. wui Evenhuis, 2006 c g
M. zetterstedti Lundstroem, 1914 c g

References

Macrocera
Articles created by Qbugbot